Yalálag Zapotec is a Zapotec language of Oaxaca, Mexico, spoken in Hidalgo Yalalag, Mexico City, Oaxaca City, Veracruz.

The Mexican government organization INALI recognizes both Yalálag Zapotec and Yatee Zapotec as a variety of Zapotec called Zapoteco serrano, del sureste.

References

Sources 
 Avelino, Heriberto. 2004. Topics in Yalálag Zapotec, with particular reference to its phonetic structures. UCLA Ph.D. dissertation.
 López, Filemón & Ronaldo Newberg Y. 2005. La conjugación del verbo zapoteco: zapoteco de Yalálag.  2nd ed. Instituto Lingüístico de Verano.
 Newberg, Ronald. 1987. Participant accessibility in Yalálag Zapotec. SIL Mexico Workpapers 9: 12-25.

External links 

OLAC resources in and about the Yalálag Zapotec language
Zapotec Survey from Hidalgo Yalálag in the Archive of the Indigenous Languages of Latin America

Zapotec languages